The Asuaj is a left tributary of the river Sălaj in Romania. It flows into the Sălaj near Rodina.

References

Rivers of Romania
Rivers of Maramureș County